Vasilios Vouzas (born 23 March 1966) is a Greek professional football manager and former player.

Career
Born in Greece, Vouzas began playing football as a defender for Alpha Ethniki side Olympiacos F.C. in 1987. He went on loan to Alpha Ethniki rivals Doxa Drama F.C. for two seasons. He would also play in the Alpha Ethniki with Ionikos F.C., Edessaikos F.C. and Ethnikos Piraeus F.C., making a total of 149 league appearances during his career.

After he retired from playing, Vouzas became a football coach. His first professional manager experience was with Chaidari F.C. from 2005 to 2008. He managed several Greek clubs over the following years, including Atromitos F.C., Ionikos F.C., Egaleo F.C. and Levadiakos F.C.

Vouzas was appointed manager of Panachaiki in January 2012.

References

1966 births
Living people
People from Mouzaki
Greek footballers
Olympiacos F.C. players
Proodeftiki F.C. players
Doxa Drama F.C. players
Ionikos F.C. players
Edessaikos F.C. players
Ethnikos Piraeus F.C. players
Panargiakos F.C. players
Super League Greece players
Association football defenders
Greek football managers
Atromitos F.C. managers
Ionikos F.C. managers
Egaleo F.C. managers
Levadiakos F.C. managers
Panachaiki F.C. managers
Iraklis Psachna F.C. managers
Thrasyvoulos F.C. managers
Paniliakos F.C. managers
Olympiacos F.C. managers
Kalamata F.C. managers
Footballers from Thessaly